Josephine is a female given name. It is the English version of the French name Joséphine. In Greece, the female name Josephine is Io̱si̱fína and used mainly on the island of Crete. The feminine form of the name Joseph, which is taken from the Hebrew name Yosef, meaning "(YHWH) shall grow."

Variations
Originally a diminutive form of the French name Joséphe, Joséphine became the standard form in the 19th century, replacing Joséphe, which eventually became a very rare name. In 2017, Josephine was the 107th most popular girls' baby name in the US. Diminutive forms of this name include Fifi, Jo, Josie, Joetta and Jojo. Other language variants include the Irish version Seosaimhín, the Spanish version Josefina or Josephina, and the Greek version Iosiphina (Greek: Ιωσηφίνα). Alternate spellings include Yosefina and Gosefine. The Swedish version is Josefine.

The name started gaining popularity after 1800 due to the high profile of Joséphine de Beauharnais, a French noblewoman who became Napoleon's mistress and later his wife and Empress of the French.

Translations 
 جوزفين (Arabic)
 * ג'וזפין (Hebrew)
 Жазэфіна, Žazefina (Belarusian)
 Josefina, Fina, Josefa (Catalan)
 约瑟芬, Yuēsèfēn (Chinese Simplified)
 約瑟芬, Yuēsèfēn (Chinese Traditional)
 Josipa, Jozefina, Finka, Ina (Croatian)
 Jozefien, Josefien, Fien (Dutch)
 Josephine, Josephin (English)
 Josefine (German)
 Josefine (Danish)
 Ιωσηφίνα, Io̱si̱fína (Greek)
 જોસેફાઈન, Jōsēphā'īna (Gujarati)
 Josefiina (Finnish)
 Joséphine, Fifi, Josette, Josiane (French)
 जोसफिन, Jōsaphina (Hindi)
 Jozefina, Jozefin, Jozefa (Hungarian)
 Giuseppina (Italian)
 ジョセフィン, Josefin (Japanese)
 ಜೋಸೆಫೀನ್, Jōsephīn (Kannada)
 조세핀, Josepin (Korean)
 Џозефин, Džozefin (Macedonian)
 Жозефина, Jozyefina (Mongolian)
 जोसेफिन, Jōsēphina (Nepali)
 ژوزفین (Persian)
 Józefina (Polish)
 Josefina (Portuguese)
 Жозефина, Zhozefina (Russian)
 Iosefina (Samoan)
 Јосефина, Josefina (Serbian)
 Josefina (Spanish)
 Josefina (Swedish)
 ஜோசபின், Jōcapiṉ (Tamil)
 జోసెఫిన్, Jōsephin (Telugu)
 โจเซฟิน, Cosefin (Thai)
 Жозефіна, Zhozefina (Ukrainian)
 דזשאָסעפינע, Dzşʼásʻpynʻ (Yiddish)

Nicknames 
Jobe, JJ, Jowse, Jody, Fi, Fientje, Fifi, Fike, Fina, Jael, Jo, Joephy, Joey, Joja, Jojo, Jos, Josa, Josie, Jossan, Jovi, Johnny, Jussus, Juza, Pepi, Peppa, Phinie, Posy, Posie, Sefi, Sefina, Sephine, Sophie, Ephine, Effy, Jo-Z, Joan, Jayla, Jay, Fini, Fine.

Male

Joséphin Péladan (1858–1918), French novelist and martinist

People with the given name Josephine

Royalty 

Joséphine-Charlotte of Belgium, Princess of Belgium, Grand Duchess of Luxembourg
Josephine of Leuchtenberg, Queen of Sweden
Joséphine de Beauharnais, Empress Consort of the French, Queen Consort of Italy, first wife of Napoleon Bonaparte
Princess Joséphine of Lorraine, Princess of Carignano
Josephine of Rosenborg, Countess, member of Denmark's Royal Family
Princess Josephine of Baden, Princess of Hohenzollern-Sigmaringen
Princess Joséphine Caroline of Belgium, wife of Prince Karl Anton of Hohenzollern
Princess Josephine of Denmark, Danish princess

Other 
Josephine Abady, American stage director, film director, and producer
Josephine Baker, American dancer, jazz and pop singer
Josephine Bakhita, ex-slave from Sudan, Catholic nun and saint
 Josefine Balluck, Austrian-American actor
Josephine Bell, English author
Josephine Thorndike Berry (1871-1945), American educator, home economist
Joséphine-Félicité-Augustine Brohan (1824–1893), French actress
Josephine Brunsvik, Hungarian countess, most likely Beethoven's Immortal Beloved
Josephine Butler, British feminist and reformer
Josephine Cashman, Aboriginal Australian lawyer and entrepreneur
Joséphine Colomb (1833-1892), French children's writer, lyricist, translator
Josephine Cox (1938–2020), English author
Josefine Cronholm, Swedish jazz vocalist and songwriter
Joséphine de La Baume, French actress
Josefine Cronholm, Swedish ski-orienteering competitor and world champion
Josephine Clay Ford (1923–2005), granddaughter of Henry Ford
Josephine Foster, American folk singer
Josephine Gates Kelly, Native American activist and politician
Josephine Clara Goldmark, American reformer
Josephine Sophia White Griffing, American social reformer
Josephine Hopper, wife and model of painter Edward Hopper
Josephine Humphreys, American novelist
Josephine Hutchinson, American actress
Joséphine Jobert, French actress and singer
Josephine Langford, Australian actress
Josephine Louise Le Monnier Newcomb, American philanthropist
Josefine Lindstrand, Swedish singer
Josephine Shaw Lowell, American social reformer
Josephine Lucchese (1893–1974), American opera singer
Josephine McGill (1877–1919), American composer and music historian
Josephine Meeker (1857–1882), American teacher and physician
Josephine Melville (1961–2022), British actress, director and writer
Josephine Mitchell (born 1965), Australian actress
Josephine Moon, Australian author
Josefine Öqvist (Anna Lenita Josefine Öqvist), Swedish female footballer
Josephine Preston Peabody, American writer
Josefine Preuß, German actor
Josefine Ridell, Swedish singer
Josephine Ruffin, early civil rights activist and suffragist
Josephine Siao, Hong Kong actress
Josephine Skriver, Danish model
Josephine Sparre, Swedish noble
Josephine Tewson (1931–2022), British actress
Josephine Tey, mystery writer
Josephine 'Jo' Williams, British businesswoman

Fictional characters
Josephine Bloom, a character played by Marion Cotillard in the 2003 film Big Fish
Josephine Balsamo, a.k.a. Countess Cagliosto, antagonist of Arsène Lupin in novels
Josephine, Captain Corcoran's daughter in the comic opera H.M.S. Pinafore
Josephine "Lena" Duchannes, second protagonist of the novel series Caster Chronicles by Kami Garcia and Margaret Stohl
Josephine "Jo" March, protagonist of the novel Little Women
Josephine “Pepi” Mutzenbacher, protagonist of the novel Josephine Mutzenbacher
Josephine Joey Potter, in the television series Dawson's Creek
Dr Josephine Jo Karev, in the television series Grey's Anatomy
Josephine Cherette Montilyet, the Chief Ambassador and Diplomat in Dragon Age Inquisition.
Josephine Anwhistle, a fictional character in the series of novels A Series of Unfortunate Events by Lemony Snicket
Josephine Ada Lightbourne, a character in the television series The 100
 Josephine Barry, a character in the television series  Anne with an E

See also
Josephina (disambiguation)
Josephine (disambiguation)
Josie (name)
Giuseppina (given name)
"Josephine the Singer, or the Mouse Folk", a short story by Franz Kafka

References

External links
 Josephine database.
 Behind The Name.
 Etymology Online.
 United States Social Security Database.

English feminine given names
Hebrew feminine given names